The Carl Gustaf 8.4 cm recoilless rifle (named after Carl Gustafs Stads Gevärsfaktori which initially produced it) is a Swedish developed  caliber man-portable shoulder-fired recoilless rifle, initially developed by the Royal Swedish Army Materiel Administration during the second half of the 1940s as a close-range anti-tank and support weapon for infantry, which has seen great export success around the globe and is today a popular multi-purpose support weapon in use by many nations. The Carl Gustaf 84 mm recoilless rifle is a lightweight, low-cost weapon that uses a wide range of ammunition, which makes it extremely flexible and suitable for a wide variety of roles.

Development of the initial model started from 1946 as one of the many recoilless rifle designs of that era, based on the experience from the earlier Carl Gustaf 20 mm recoilless rifle and the success of man-portable rocket launchers during World War II, such as the Bazooka and Panzerschreck. Production of the initial model was handled by Carl Gustafs Stads Gevärsfaktori lead by Försvarets Fabriksverk (FFV) and the weapon received the designation 8,4 cm granatgevär m/48, (8,4 cm grg m/48 – "8,4 cm grenade rifle", model 1948) in Swedish service. FFV would continue to further develop the weapon for the international market, later being merged into Saab Bofors Dynamics which handles development and export today. While similar weapons have generally disappeared from service, the Carl Gustaf is still in production and remains in widespread use today.

Name 
The weapon goes under many names around the globe. It is most frequently called the "Carl Gustaf" or similar for short. British troops, for example, refer to it as the "Charlie G", while Canadian troops often refer to it as "Carl G". In Australia, it is irreverently known as "Charlie Gutsache" (guts ache, meaning stomach pain), or "Charlie Swede".

In U.S. military service, it is officially known as the M3 Multi-Role Anti-Armor Anti-Personnel Weapon System (MAAWS) or Ranger Antitank Weapons System (RAWS), but is often simply called the "M3 Carl Gustaf" or just "Gustaf".

In Swedish military service, it is officially known as the 8,4 cm granatgevär m/48, m/86 and m/18, depending on the model (M1, M3, M4), but is often simply referred to as the "GRG" (gé-er-gé) after their type designation abbreviation (from granatgevär, meaning "grenade rifle"), since all models  fire the same general ammunition and are used in much the same way (although the 84 mm grg m/18 can use programmable and guided ammunition).

Description 

The basic weapon consists of the main tube with the breech-mounted Venturi recoil damper, with two grips near the front and a shoulder mount. The weapon is fitted with iron sights, but is normally aimed with the attached 3× optical sight with a 17 degree (300 mil) field of view. The most modern variants fielded by Swedish rifle companies have been fitted with the Swedish Aimpoint sighting system. Luminous front and rear sight inserts are available for the iron sights when aiming at night, and an image intensification system may also be used.

The Gustaf can be fired from the standing, kneeling, sitting or prone positions, and a bipod may be attached in front of the shoulder piece. An operating handle called the "Venturi lock" is used to move the hinged breech to one side for reloading.

Operation 
The weapon is normally operated by a two-man crew, a gunner who carries and fires the weapon and a loader, carrying two canisters for a total of four rounds of ammunition. One or two extra ammunition carriers can be assigned if heavy use is expected.
In the firing procedure it is the loader's responsibility to check the area behind the weapon for people and for obstacles that can interfere with the back-blast; this is needed due to the inherent dangers of the back-blast.  Any person within the back-blast cone can suffer severe burn injuries and solid objects closely behind can reflect the blast back onto the crew.

Safety precautions 

The overpressure, or blast wave, generated by the Gustaf will cause blast- and burn-related injuries to those behind the weapon, and is dangerous to 30 meters and hazardous to about 50 to 75 meters. Repeatedly firing the Gustaf can also cause related shock wave injuries to gunners and those nearby.

Gunners are only allowed to fire six rounds a day during training. The assistant gunners would also often move away from the overpressure zone, so that they too can fire six rounds a day. Sweden, the first user of Carl-Gustaf, has the regulation that both gunner and assistant gunner are allowed to have 20 full caliber rounds each day.

History

1946 – M1 in Sweden (8,4 cm grg m/48) 

The Carl Gustaf M1 was developed around 1946 by Hugo Abramson and Harald Jentzen at the Royal Swedish Army Materiel Administration (Kungliga Arméförvaltningens Tygavdelning) and produced at Carl Gustafs Stads Gevärsfaktori from where it derives its name. Development of the weapons system was preceded by the Carl Gustaf 20 mm recoilless rifle (Swedish designation 20 mm pansarvärnsgevär m/42, abbr. 20 mm pvg m/42) developed between 1940 and 1942. Despite advances in recoilless rifle technology introduced by the device, it was quickly discovered that a relatively small-bore solid steel penetrator was obsolete for a shoulder-fired antitank weapon. The 84 mm weapon was first introduced into Swedish service in 1948 as the 8,4 cm granatgevär m/48, filling the same anti-tank role as the U.S. Army's bazooka, British PIAT and German Panzerschreck. Unlike these weapons, however, the Gustaf used a rifled barrel for spin-stabilising its rounds, as opposed to fins used by the other systems.

The result was superior accuracy at longer ranges.

The Gustaf was soon sold around the world and became one of the primary squad-level anti-tank weapons for many West European armies.

1964 – M2 export 
The Carl Gustaf M2 was introduced in 1964 as an improved, lighter and slightly shorter version of the original M1 for the export market. It quickly replaced the original version.

The German Bundeswehr maintains a small number of M2s for battlefield illumination.

1986 – M3 in Sweden (8,4 cm grg m/86) 

The Carl Gustaf M3 started development in the 1980s and initially entered service with the Swedish Armed Forces as the \8,4 cm granatgevär m/86 ("8,4 cm grenade rifle", model 1986). While similar to the export M3, it shares some spare parts with the original 1948 M1 model. It reduced the weight even further by replacing the forged steel tube with a thin steel liner containing the rifling, strengthened by a carbon fibre outer sleeve. The external steel parts were also replaced with plastics and aluminium alloys.

1991 – M3 export 
The current export Carl-Gustaf M3 version was introduced in 1991. In recent years, the M3 has found new life in a variety of roles. The British Special Air Service, United States Army Special Forces and United States Army Rangers use M3s in bunker-busting and anti-vehicle roles. Many armies continue to use it as a viable anti-armour weapon, especially against 1950s- and 1960s-era tanks and other armoured vehicles still in use worldwide.

2011 – M3 in USA (M3 MAAWS) 
In the late 1980s, the Special Operations Forces Modernization Action Plan indicated need for a Ranger Anti-Armor/Anti-Personnel Weapon System (RAAWS) to replace the M67 recoilless rifle in use by the 75th Ranger Regiment. A market survey in 1987 indicated that the Carl Gustaf M3 was the best candidate for satisfying RAAWS requirements. On 29 September 1988, the M3 was selected as the RAAWS from candidate proposals submitted in response to the market survey compiled by ARDEC. A subsequent review of the contractor-supplied fatigue test data determined that the data did not meet U.S. Army requirements. Benét Laboratories conducted fatigue tests of two tubes to establish an interim safe service life for the weapon. Tests were conducted in 1993. The manufacturer's recommended life for the weapon was 500 rounds, but bore surfaces showed no indications of erosion until 2,360 rounds. The U.S. Navy SEALs became interested in the program and moved it to a Joint Integrated Product Team. The program name subsequently changed from the RAAWS to the Multi-Role Anti-Armor Anti-Personnel Weapon System (MAAWS).

The M3 Multi-Role Anti-Armor Anti-Personnel Weapon System is the U.S. military designation for the Carl-Gustaf M3 recoilless rifle. It is primarily used by United States Special Operations Command such as the Army Rangers, Army Special Forces, Marine Raiders, Navy SEALs, and JSOC operators. When used by the U.S. Army's 75th Ranger Regiment, the M3 is known as the Ranger Anti-tank Weapons System (RAWS).

Army Rangers found the M3 was best employed using a two-man team. One person would carry the launcher and be armed with a pistol for personal protection, and the other would carry 5–6 rounds of ammunition and act as a spotter for the gunner. Although the single-shot AT4 is lighter and can be carried by one person, a Gustaf team with the heavier recoilless rifle can reload and fire more rounds.

The M3 MAAWS fires the following ammunition:
 High explosive (HE 441/441B) round
 High-explosive anti-tank (HEAT/751) round
 High-explosive anti-tank – rocket assisted projectile (HEAT-RAP/551) round
 High-explosive dual-purpose (HEDP/502) round
 Area defense munition (ADM/401) round
 Anti-structure munition (ASM/509) round
 Smoke (Smk/469) round
 Illumination (Illum/545) round
 Target practice, tracer(TPT/141) round
 Target practice rocket assisted projectile (TP RAP/551) round

In November 2011, the U.S. Army began ordering the M3 MAAWS for regular units deployed in Afghanistan. Soldiers were being engaged with RPGs at 900 meters, while their light weapons had effective ranges of 500–600 meters. The Gustaf allows airburst capability of troops in defilade out to 1,250 meters, and high explosive use out to 1,300 meters.

In late 2012, the Army fielded 58 M3s and 1,500 rounds of ammunition to units deployed to Afghanistan to destroy enemy targets out to 1,000 meters. This was because RPG and machine gun teams could attack 900 meters away, while existing weaponry such as the M141 Bunker Defeat Munition, M72 LAW, M136 AT4, and MK153 SMAW have effective ranges of only 500 meters. The AT4 is lighter and cheaper but is made of reinforced fiberglass, while the M3's rifled metal/carbon fiber launch tube allows for reloading. Employing the 22 lb M3 is easier than the 50 lb FGM-148 Javelin with its launcher with missile and reusable command launch unit, is faster than waiting on mortars, and is cheaper than the Javelin and artillery shells for engaging targets in hard cover. Although Special Operations forces had been using the M3 since the early 1990s, light infantry unit commanders in Afghanistan had to submit operational needs statements to get the weapon. The M3 became an official Program of Record in the conventional Army in 2014, and a conditional materiel release was authorized in late 2015 to equip all brigade combat teams with one M3 launcher per infantry platoon.

2014 – M4 export 

While the M3 MAAWS provided enhanced effectiveness over other launchers, its  weight burdened troops. On 28 March 2013, USSOCOM announced a call for sources to develop a kit to lighten the weapon and reduce overall length without affecting handling or ruggedness. By that time, Saab was developing a weight-reduced version prior to the SOCOM release that demonstrated no decrease in performance, no increase in recoil, and nearly equivalent barrel life that could be ready for government testing in 2014. Saab has also developed a new high explosive round that has a direct fire range of 1,500 meters when using a fire control system.

The Carl Gustaf M4 was revealed by Saab at Association of the U.S. Army 2014. Compared to the M3 MAAWS, the M4 is  lighter, weighing , and shorter with a  overall length. The shorter length was in response to the need to wield the weapon in urban terrain, and weight savings were achieved through using lighter components whenever possible including a carbon fibre tube with titanium liner, and a new venturi design. Other new features include a red-dot sight, a travel safety catch to allow the M4 to be carried while loaded, an adjustable shoulder rest and forward grip for improved ergonomics, a shot counter to keep track of how many rounds have been fired to manage the weapon's 1,000-round barrel life, double that of the M3, picatinny rails for grips and sight mounts, and a remote round management function so intelligent sights can communicate with programmable rounds.

2017 – M4 in USA (M3E1 MAAWS) 

Following its reveal in 2014, the US Defence Department agreed to evaluate the shorter and lighter M4 version over the next two years; testing and qualifications were planned to be completed in spring 2017, and the weapon type classified as the M3E1 Multi-Role Anti-Armor Anti-Personnel Weapon System in fall 2017, making the system available for procurement to all Department of Defence services. The first unit was planned to be equipped with the M3E1 in 2018.

In April 2019, a contract of SEK 168 million (US$18.1 million) was approved to supply the Australian Army with ammunition for the Carl-Gustaf M4 84 mm multipurpose weapon systems ordered by the service in September 2018.

M3 was the name used for decades worldwide for the basic weapon. For the new, improved, lighter, titanium-employing weapon first displayed in 2014, most used the name M4, except for the US. In the US, the Army designation for the US version of the improved M4 mentioned above is M3E1.

In 2017, the U.S. Army approved a requirement for 1,111 M3E1 units to be fielded to soldiers as part of an Urgent Material Release. The M3E1 is part of the Product Manager Crew Served Weapon portfolio. A key benefit of the M3E1 is that it can fire multiple types of rounds, giving soldiers increased capability on the battlefield. By using titanium, the updated M3E1, based on the M3A1 introduced in 2014, is more than six pounds lighter. The M3E1 is also 2.5 inches shorter and has an improved carrying handle, shoulder padding and an improved sighting system that can be adjusted for better comfort without sacrificing performance. The wiring harness was included in the M3E1 configuration that provides a foregrip controller and programmable fuze setter for an interchangeable fire control system. For added safety and cost savings, an automatic round counter enables soldiers and logisticians to accurately track the service life of each weapon. The M3E1 uses the same family of ammunition as the M3, which has been successfully tested. In November 2017, the U.S. Marine Corps announced they planned to procure the M3E1 MAAWS. 1,200 M3E1s would be acquired with one fielded to every infantry squad. In addition to infantry use, the Marines are considering it to replace the Mk 153 SMAW in combat engineer squads. The weapons perform similar functions and the improvements incorporated into the new M3E1 place it in the same size and approximate weight class as the SMAW. While the SMAW weighs  less when loaded, the MAAWS has a greater variety of ammunition available and a maximum effective range of 1,000 meters, twice that of the SMAW. The Marines plan to test both weapons' effectiveness against bunkers to inform their decision.

2018 – M4 in Sweden (8,4 cm grg m/18) 
In 2018 the Swedish Defence Materiel Administration (FMV) signed a contract with Saab to purchase the Carl Gustaf M4 as the 8,4 cm granatgevär m/18 ("8,4 cm grenade rifle", model 2018), often written without the "m/" to distinguish it from older m/18 (model 1918) systems (8,4 cm granatgevär 18, abbr. 8,4 cm grg 18). The M4 will replace the old M1 models (8,4 cm grg m/48) models still in service as some units are pushing 70+ years in service. The 8,4 cm grg 18 will feature an advanced laser rangefinder and will be acquired with new programmable ammunition (preliminary name HE 448), and a new, improved HEAT shell.

2024 – M4 in India 
Saab announced in September 2022 that it would establish a manufacturing facility to produce the Carl-Gustaf M4 weapons system in India. It will be the company's first facility producing the M4 system outside Sweden. The facility is expected to open in 2024 and will produce weapons for the Indian Armed Forces as well as export components to users worldwide. Previous versions of the Carl Gustaf system have been in service with India since 1976.

Ammunition 

Improvements to the ammunition have been continual. While the older HEAT rounds are not particularly effective against modern tank armor, the weapon has found new life as a bunker-buster with a high-explosive dual-purpose (HEDP) round. Also, improved HEAT, high explosive (HE), smoke and illumination (star shell or flare) ammunition is also available. For full effectiveness, illumination rounds must be fired at a very high angle, creating a danger for the gunner who can be burned from the backblast. For this reason, several armies have retired the illumination rounds, while the U.S. Army requires that they be fired from a standing position.

Note that the following are the Swedish manufacturer designations (other countries use similar terminology, replacing the "FFV - Försvarets Fabriksverk")
 FFV401 is an Area Defence Munition designed as a close-range anti-personnel round. It fires 1100 flechettes over a wide area. 
 FFV441 is an HE round, useful in a "lobbed" trajectory to 1,000m, which can be fused to either detonate on impact or as an airburst.
 FFV441B is an HE round with an effective range against personnel in the open of 1,100 m. The round arms after 20 to 70 m of flight, weighs 3.1 kg, and is fired at a muzzle velocity of 255 m/s.
 FFV469 is a smoke round fired like the FFV441, with a range of about 1,300 m. The 3.1 kg round is also fired at 255 m/s.
 FFV502 is an HEDP round with the ability to be set to detonate on either impact or one-tenth second later. Effective range is 1,000 m against dispersed soft targets such as infantry in the open, 500 m against stationary targets and 300 m against moving targets. Minimum range is 15 to 40 m to arm the warhead. Penetration exceeds 150 mm of rolled homogeneous armour (RHA). Ammunition weight is 3.3 kg and muzzle velocity is 230 m/s.
 FFV509 is an ASM (Anti-Structure Munition), designed especially to destroy buildings and other types of urban constructions. The fuse has two modes: impact or a delayed function.
 FFV545 is an illuminating star shell, fired up to 2,300 m maximum range, but with an effective envelope of 300 to 2,100 m. Suspended by parachute, the star shell burns for 30 seconds while producing 650,000 candela, providing a 400 to 500 m diameter area of illumination.
 FFV551 is the primary HEAT round and is a rocket-assisted projectile (RAP). Effective range is up to 700 m (400 m against moving targets) and penetration up to 400 mm of RHA. Ammunition weight is 3.2 kg and muzzle velocity is 255 m/s.
 FFV552 is a practice round with the same ballistics as the 551.
 FFV651 is a newer HEAT round using mid-flight rocket assistance for ranges up to 1,000m. In theory, it has less penetration than the FFV551, but it includes a stand-off probe for the fuse to improve performance against reactive armour.
 HEAT 655 CS (Confined Spaces) "high-explosive anti-tank (HEAT) round that can be fired by the 84 mm Carl Gustaf recoilless weapon from within small enclosures."
 FFV751 is a tandem-warhead HEAT round with an effective range of 500 m and ability to penetrate more than 500 mm of armour. Weight is 4 kg.
 FFV756 is an MT (Multi Target) ammunition, designed for combat in built-up areas and for incapacitating an enemy under cover inside a building or some type of fortification. The MT 756 uses a tandem charge.
 Guided Multipurpose Munition (GMM) is a laser guided projectile developed between Saab and Raytheon, featuring a multipurpose warhead capable of defeating bunkers and moving light armored vehicles at a range of 2,500 m and can be fired from enclosed spaces.

Comparison to similar weapons

Users 

 
 : M2 replaced by M3 variant. M4 on order.
 
 
 
 
 
 
 
 
 
 : M1 officially called M/65, M2 called M/79, M3 called M/85. M4 to be delivered in 2022. With each new variant older variant outphased. All variants have commonly been referred to as "Dysekanon" in the Danish army.
 : M2, M3 variants. Purchased 250 M4s in 2021 for $12.7 million to replace M2 variants.
 
 
 : M4
 
 : A modified version has also been developed by the DRDO which is significantly lighter due to use of advanced composites.
 : Used by the Komando Pasukan Katak (Kopaska) tactical diver group and Komando Pasukan Khusus (Kopassus) special forces group.
 : Iraqi Kurdistan received 40 launchers and 1,000 projectiles in 2014
 : Defence Forces specialist units, including Army Ranger Wing (ARW).
 
 : M2 called 84 mm Recoilless Rifle, M3 called '
 
 .
: M4 on order.

: M2, M3 and M4.
 : M2 and M3 variant in service. 110 new units of M4 variant ordered in 2021.
 : Used by divisional heavy weapon companies in bunker busting/infantry support/light artillery role for counter-insurgency campaigns. Clones made as BA-84(MA-84) MK and MK-II.
 
 
 
 : M2, M3, M4
 : Used by special forces.
 : M2 and M3 variants used by Portuguese Army and Portuguese Marine Corps.
 
 
 : M3, launch customer for the M4 variant, which became operational in July 2017.
 : M2, M3. M4 on order will replace all old M2, M3 between 2020 and 2023.
Tamil Eelam: Used by the Tamil Tigers during the Final Eelam War.
 
  100 units with 2000 rounds of ammunition donated by the Government of Canada due to the Russo-Ukrainian War. Ukrainian claimed a Carl Gustaf was used to destroy the second T-90 tank during the war.
 
 : Used by USSOCOM, U.S. Army Ranger battalions, and some regular U.S. Army infantry units in the War in Afghanistan. In February 2014, the M3 MAAWS was designated as a Program of Record within the U.S. Army and became standard-issue in Army Light Infantry units.

Former users 
 : The M2 was in service with the Royal Netherlands Army since 1964, known as the Terugstootloze vuurmond (TLV) 84 mm, Carl Gustaf M-2. It is used in combination with the Kijker, richt, recht, 2x12 Wöhler scope. The same model was also used in the Dutch Marine Corps, where it was known as the Terugstootloze vuurmond (TLV) van 84 mm, Carl Gustaf, M2.<ref>Handboek voor de Marinier 1978 p. 21-53</ref> It was replaced by the Panzerfaust 3.
 : Replaced by MATADOR in 2013.
 : M2 variant was used from the 1970s until the early 1990s, when it was replaced by LAW 80. AEI Systems Ltd., a British defence products manufacturer headquartered in Ascot, Berkshire, offers a variant of the platform dubbed the AE84-RCL'' designed to fire the M540/M550 line of 84×246 mm R ammunition manufactured in Belgium by Mecar.

Wars 

Congo Crisis
Falklands War
Lebanese Civil War
Gulf War
Kargil War
Nordic Biker War
Chiapas conflict
War in Afghanistan
Iraq War
Mexican drug war
Eelam War IV
2011 Libyan Civil War
2013 Lahad Datu standoff
Iraqi Civil War (2014–2017)
2022 Russian invasion of Ukraine

See also 

 55 S 55 (Finland, 1955, 55 mm, man-portable)
 M40 recoilless rifle (United States, 1955, 105 mm, tripod mounted)
 RPG-2 (USSR, 1954, man-portable)
 B-10 recoilless rifle (USSR, 1954, 82 mm, tripod mounted)

References

External links 

 Saabs Bofors – manufacturer's product page
 Saab Bofors – official manufacturer's brochure
 Video of loading and firing drill for Carl Gustaf recoilless rifle
 Video of a Carl Gustaf recoilless rifle being fired
 M3 MAAWS at GlobalSecurity.org
 Carl Gustaf anti-tank recoilless rifle (Sweden) – Modern Firearms
 U.S. Army Armament Research, Development & Engineering Center FCT and SOCOM Shoulder Fired Weapons May 2005

Weapons and ammunition introduced in 1948
Anti-tank weapons
Recoilless rifles
Firearms of Sweden

da:Dysekanon